Volzhanka is a rural locality (a settlement) in Verkhnepogromenskoye Rural Settlement, Sredneakhtubinsky District, Volgograd Oblast, Russia. The population was 166 as of 2010. There are 8 streets.

Geography 
Volzhanka is located near the left bank of the Volga River, 41 km NNE of Srednyaya Akhtuba (the district's administrative centre) by road. Rakhinka is the nearest rural locality.

References 

Rural localities in Sredneakhtubinsky District